Bada la Djandza is a village on the island of Anjouan in the Comoros. According to the 1991 census the town had a population of 525. The current estimate for 2009 is 1,011 people

References

Populated places in Anjouan